Salim Boumechra (born 28 April 1983 in Oran) is an Algerian football player who is currently playing for MC Oran in the Algerian Ligue Professionnelle 1.

Club career
In December 2007, he was linked with a move to Ligue 1 clubs SM Caen and RC Lens. However, an injury prevented either deal from going through. Boumechra signed with MC Alger in the summer of 2008, joining them on a free transfer from ASM Oran.

Honours
 Won the Algerian Ligue Professionnelle 1 once with MC Alger in 2010
 Finalist of the Algerian Cup once with USM El Harrach in 2011

References

1983 births
Algerian footballers
Living people
Footballers from Oran
MC Alger players
USM El Harrach players
Algerian Ligue Professionnelle 1 players
ASM Oran players
USM Alger players
MC Oran players
Association football midfielders
Association football forwards
21st-century Algerian people